Jesús Pérez may refer to:

Jesús Salvador Pérez (born 1971), Colombian boxer
Jesús Pérez (cyclist) (born 1984), Venezuelan road cyclist
Jesús Pérez (footballer, born 1995), Trinidadian footballer
Jesús Pérez (footballer, born 2000), Mexican footballer
Jesús Pérez (water polo) (born 1948), Cuban Olympic water polo player
Jesús Alejandro Pérez, Cuban-Canadian multi-instrumentalist and bandleader 
Jesús Pérez (soccer) (born 1997), American soccer player